Jean Pepermans, sometimes Latinized Joannes Pepermannus (active 1620–1635) was a 17th-century printer and bookseller, official printer to the city of Brussels. Very little is known about his life, but he published works by or about some of the leading figures at the Brussels court.

Archival records
In 1634 he was paid £150 for printing a memorial to the Infanta Isabella Clara Eugenia, Mausolee erigé à la memoire d'Isabelle-Claire-Eugenie by Jean Puget de la Serre.

Publications

1621
Michel Salon, Een cleyn beworp des levens ende miraeckelen van den H. Thomas Van Villa-Nova – a life of Thomas of Villanova Available on Google Books
 Aubertus Miraeus, De Bello bohemico, Ferdinandi II Caesaris auspiciis, feliciter gesto commentarius – A commentary on the Bohemian Revolt from a Habsburg perspective
 N. N., Copie d'une lettre qu'un seigneur de la court escrivit à un sien amis sur le trespas du roy Don Phelipe Troisiesme d'Espagnol, translated from Spanish to French by Jean vander Heyden – an account of the death of Philip III of Spain Available on Google Books
 Claude Chappuisot, Oraison funebre sur la mort de ce Treshaut, Trespuisant, et Trescatholique Prince Albert Archiduc d'Autriche – a funerary oration for Albert VII, Archduke of Austria

1622
 Funérailles du sérénissime prince archiduc Albert, représentées par les escholiers du collège de la Compagnie de Jésus
 Sanctorum Ignati et Xaveri in divos relatorum triumphus Bruxellae ab aula et urbe celebratus – an account of the celebration in Brussels of the canonisations of Ignatius Loyola and Francis Xavier. Available on Google Books
 Isabel Clara Eugenia byde Gratie Gods– a decree on the lodging of soldiers Available on Google Books
 Aubertus Miraeus, Serenissimi Alberti Belgarum principis elogium et funus – a eulogy of Archduke Albert
 Aubertus Miraeus, Isabellae sanctae : Elisabetha Joannis Bapt. mater, Elisabetha Andr. regis Hung. filia, Isabella regina Portugalliae, Isabella, S. Lud. Galliae regis soror – on various saints named Isabel or Elizabeth
 Aubertus Miraeus, Fasti belgici et burgundici – on the saints celebrated or venerated in the Low Countries and Franche-Comté. Available on Google Books from Lyon Public Library and from the National Library Rome
 Aubertus Miraeus, Elenchus historicorum et aliorum scriptorum – a finding list of unpublished historical manuscripts in libraries in the Low Countries Available on Google Books
 Monasterii Viridis Vallis in Sonia silva, prope Bruxellam – on Groenendael Priory
 Crisóstomo Henríquez, Vita Joannis Rusbroquii– a life of John of Ruysbroeck

1623
 Andres de Soto, Contemplaciones del crucifixo: y consideraciones de Christo crucificado, y de los dolores que la Virgen sanctissima padescio al pie de la cruz – contemplations on the crucifix Available on Google Books

1624
 Francis Bell, The Rule of the Religious, of the Thirde Order of Saint Francis: For both sexes, making the three vowes, and living together in communitie and cloyster
 Crisóstomo Henríquez, Fasciculus sanctorum Ordinis Cisterciensis, complectens Cisterciensium ascetarum praeclarissima gesta, huius Ordinis exordium, incrementum, progressum, praecipuarum abbatiarum per universum orbem fundationes Available on Google Books
 Aubertus Miraeus, Rerum Belgicarum Annales Available on Google Books from the Bavarian State Library
 Theatrum Iaponiensis constantiae qua supra centum octodecim illustrissimi martyres atrocissimis suppliciis excruciati anno M.DC.XXII. pro fide Iesu Christi per ignem et gladium et aquam coronam gloria reportaverunt – on the great martyrdom in Nagasaki in 1622

1625
 Ambrosio de Salazar, Las Clavellinas de recreation: donde se contienen Sentencias, avisos, exemplos, y Historias muy agradables, en dos lenguas, Francesa y Castellana – a bilingual collection of anecdotes and short stories
 Andres de Soto, Beschouwinghen op het kruycifix ende op de smerten welcke de heylighste Maghet Maria lede aen den voedt des Kruys – Dutch translation of Contemplacion del crucifixo (1623 above) by Jan van Blitterswyck
 François Paludanus, Brief discours de la vie, vertue et miracles du bienheureux père Jacques de la Marque – a life of St James of the Marches  Available on Google Books

1626
 Tragi-comedie Nostre Dame de la Paix – Jesuit student drama
 Den gulden sonnen wyser oft horologie van de passie ons heeren Jesu Christi

1627
 Antonius Sanderus, Gandavum sive Gandavensium rerum libri sex Available on Google Books
 Defence de la Verité et Responce du Sieur de Brion contre l'Imposture calumnieuse du libelle diffamatoire publié sous le nom de manifeste de Maximilian de Billehé

1630
 Tooneel van de moedigheydt van vier predicanten binnen s'Hertoghen-bosch: Ende cloeckveerdicheyt van twee catholijcke proffessoren binnen Lueven

1632
 Jean-Jacques Courvoisier, Extases de la princesse du Midy, la belle Malceda, au palais du sage roy Salomon Available on Google Books
 Basilius Pontius, De sacramento matrimonii tractatus
 Ogier Ghislain de Busbecq, Epistolarum Legationis Gallicae Available on Google Books from Lyon Public Library and from the National Library Rome

1634
 Jean Puget de la Serre, Mausolee erige a la memoire d'Isabelle-Claire-Eugenie Available from Google Books
 Jean de Wachtendonck, Oratio funebris Isabellae Clarae Eugeniae Hispaniarum infantis

1635
 Discours sur la rencontre du temps et des affaires presente par un vieulx cavalier francois a monseigneur le duc Dorleans Available on Google Books from Ghent University Library and Lyon Public Library
 Lettre de sa Majesté Imperiale a son agent a Rome, contenant les raisons pour lesquelles il a faict la paix avec le Duc de Saxe M. DC. XXXV
 Libre & sincère discours d'un serviteur très-humble & très-affectionné à la Coronne de France

References

Year of birth unknown
Year of death unknown
17th-century printers
Book publishers (people) of the Spanish Netherlands
Businesspeople from Brussels